Zhang Linru (born 23 September 1999) is a Chinese athlete specialising in the shot put. She represented her country at the 2019 World Championships in Doha without reaching the final. In 2018, she won a silver medal at the World U20 Championships in Tampere.

Her personal bests in the event are 18.05 metres outdoors (Shenyang 2019) and 16.71 metres indoors (Xi'an 2019).

International competitions

References

1999 births
Living people
Chinese female shot putters
World Athletics Championships athletes for China
21st-century Chinese women